Cabela's Outdoor Adventures is a hunting video game released only in North America on September 8, 2009 by Activision for home consoles, and on October 13, 2009 for the PC. It is the second game in the series to be released on the seventh-generation consoles, as well as on PlayStation 2 and PC.

The game was announced by Activision in a press release in July 2009. There are over 50 hunting and fishing adventures and intensive use of gear and tactics. Emphasis is placed on moments that are instinctively associated with hunting and fishing. New to the series is a reworked shooting system known as VITALS (Visually Integrated Targeting and Lock-on System) that allows the player to focus on delivering an accurate shot to the prey's vitals. The game received favorable reviews from critics, with praise given for improvement from previous installments of the series. Unlike the first game, this one only has the story mode and lets you shoot whatever you encounter.

Gameplay
The game features North America's top outdoor destinations, over 50 hunting and fishing adventures and intensive use of gear and tactics, such as animal calls and stealth skills. Emphasis is placed on moments that are instinctively associated with hunting and fishing, like deer stalking, squeezing the trigger, hooking a fish or snap-shooting a flushed bird, all while respecting real life hunting rules and regulations. Players can also upgrade their hunting gear with authentically branded real life equipment. It features fishing, bird hunting, and hunting for bigger game. In the 50 planned outings that are available for play, virtual outdoorsmen and women can set their sights on great variety of a herd animals, predators, and game birds, or cast a line for several species of fresh and saltwater fish. Multiple difficulty levels are available, with a tutorial mode for less experienced hunters and gamers.

New to the series is a reworked shooting system known as VITALS (Visually Integrated Targeting and Lock-on System) that allows the player to focus on delivering an accurate shot to the prey's vitals, while also creating a closer and more personal view of the animals as they react realistically to being hunted.

Plot
An unnamed character is in Kansas to hunt for some trophy white-tailed deer. His guide, Ricky, tells him to first practice his wing-shooting skills on some ring-necked pheasants. Then the player stalks up to a meadow where he sees a few bucks. The guide spooks the deer towards the player and he kills a 10 pt. buck. The player is told by the guide to hike to a ridge to get a view of some deer he spotted in the valley below. The player hikes through a forest, hunting black-tailed prairie dog and blue grouse, and gets to the valley and shoots the buck from a lower ridge. Then the guide tells the player to head over the next ridge to get to another deer herd. Once the player makes it to the narrow valley, the guide scares the deer toward him. In the next area, there is a buck grazing that is deaf because of a nearby waterfall. The player takes the advantage and stalks up and shoots it. Then he hikes through another ravine to get to a forest clearing where the guide put scent spots to attract the deer. The player hikes to an outcropping to wait, where he sees a 6. point buck and shoots it. Then the player is in a blind and is told to hunt some mallard ducks and then he goes to fish for white bass and crappie. The player is stalking a group of deer but when he shoots one buck, the other runs away. The guide tells the player to hike up to a mountain ridge to get a view of the other side. Once the player completes a hunt for eastern turkey, he hikes up the mountain and shoots the other buck in the clearing below. Then he is told by the guide that he saw a large buck in a valley and that the player should take it, after he hunts cottontail rabbits. After some hiking, the player stumbles across a battle site and spooks the trophy, and he shoots him on the run.

Next the player goes to Idaho where the guide says he will hunt Rocky Mountain elk. After the player hikes up a slope where the guide set up a blind to hunt Merriam's turkey, he calls them in. After the player hunts one, he goes to a lone tree to set up a tree stand and call in an elk. Then the player is on a forest slope when the guide tells him to practice his shooting on some yellow-bellied marmots. After that, the guide tells the player that he spotted a mule deer herd in a clearing up the slope. The player hikes up there and bags one of them. After that, the guide makes a deal with a rancher so the player can hunt coyotes. After this, the player continues toward a lake where there is another mule deer herd. After hunting a buck there, he goes to another area where there are two small mule deer bucks in a blackberry patch. Once he bags them, he heads down to a clearing where the guide says he spotted some elk. As soon as the player gets in a tree stand, an albino elk suddenly appears. After killing two elk, the player heads off to fish for smallmouth bass and rainbow trout, then hunt for blue-winged teal. Next he goes to an area where the guide has spotted some mountain goat. After killing a goat up on some rocky ridges, the player heads to an area where there are more goats. Once he bags a dark-colored mountain goat, the guide informs him of a large bull elk. After he finds the bull elk and his herd across a river, the player shoots him with a pistol.

The next stop is British Columbia. After hunting a Columbian blacktail buck, the player goes to another area where, because of a nearby cabin, he can only use a pistol. After bagging two blacktail bucks, he goes to a river where there's a woodland caribou herd. Once the player calls in and kills a bull caribou, he goes to a lake where, after hunting some ruffed grouse, he has to sneak past some does to shoot a buck. After this, the player hunts Canada geese and fishes for brown trout and walleye. Then the player goes near a lake where he finds two blacktail bucks. After taking both bucks, the guide tells him to hunt black bear. Following a hunt for raccoons, the player finds the bear's bedding area and waits for him. After bagging the bear, he goes to an area where there's a huge caribou trophy. The player calls him in and shoots him.

The player's last destination is Alaska. The guide tells him of an elusive, piebled Sitka deer buck ahead. You stalk up to the Sitka deer herd, however the piebled buck runs away. Then the player goes to an area where there are moose. After setting up a decoy and taking a bull moose, the player heads over to a small pond where the piebled buck is, hunting fox squirrel along the way. Although the elusive buck gets away again, he is able to shoot another, smaller buck. The guide then warns the player that he's heading into bear country. Sure enough, he finds two brown bears near a river. After following them downstream, the player successfully kills both bears with a muzzleloader. Then the guide informs him of an even bigger bear nearby. After crossing the river and hunting white-tailed ptarmigan, the player finds the large bear outside a cave and kills him. Then the player hunts for harlequin duck and fishes for northern pike and Chinook salmon. After this, he goes after the piebled buck again. After following the elusive buck through a few bedding areas, the player finally calls him in and shoots him with a bow.

Development
In a press release in July 2009, Activision announced that the game was going to be released in fall 2009 for the Xbox 360, PlayStation 2, PlayStation 3, Wii and PC. It was going to feature "a simulation-style, seamlessly integrated experience that includes big game hunting, fishing and bird shooting". David Oxford of Activision Publishing stated "Never before has a Cabela's game had so much variety. We went back to the drawing board with the folks at Cabela's and listened closely to the serious enthusiasts of each of these disciplines to make sure Cabela's Outdoor Adventures is the most complete game ever for sportsmen". Bryan Stave of Cabela's commented "I commend Activision for their commitment to simulating the outdoor sports in a challenging, fun and exciting format. Cabela's Outdoor Adventures gives real enthusiasts their fix when they can't be in a forest or on a lake".

Reception

The game received mixed reviews from critics. For the Xbox 360 version, GameFocus stated that it "was able to see an improvement from most of past Cabela games". Lucas Thomas from IGN noted "It's got a few issues and the fishing's mostly phoned in, but Outdoor Adventures may well be a decent option for aspiring woodsmen this season". While Official Xbox Magazine called the game "A decent hunting adventure". PSX Extreme editor Ben Dutka commented "Cabela's Outdoor Adventures is an okay production that has some nice elements and makes a valiant effort to be well worth the $40 price tag. It falls just a little shy".

For the Wii version, IGN's Lucas Thomas stated "Diving into this one is quick and easy, and you can play for short periods of time and still see a lot of action, instead of just sitting around and waiting for hours for bucks and birds to wander by".

References

2009 video games
Activision games
Cabela's video games
Hunting video games
PlayStation 2 games
PlayStation 3 games
Video games developed in Romania
Wii games
Windows games
Xbox 360 games
Fun Labs games
Single-player video games
Sand Grain Studios games
Magic Wand Productions games